Andrew James Caton (born 3 December 1987) is an English footballer who plays in midfield. He played in the Football League for Swindon Town.

Career
Caton was born in Oxford; his father, Tommy Caton, was at the time an Oxford United player. Caton began his career in the Southampton centre of excellence, and played for North Leigh in the Hellenic Football League, before joining Swindon Town on a scholarship in 2004. He made his first-team debut a few weeks later, aged 16, on 7 August, as a 74th-minute substitute away to Wrexham in League One and scored a late goal as Swindon lost 2–1. His Swindon career was disrupted by injuries, and he spent several spells on loan to non-League clubs, before he was released in January 2008. He played 15 matches for Swindon, with five starts, and scored once.

He then played for Witney United, Team Bath, Oxford City, Weymouth and North Leigh.

References

External links

Team Bath Profile

1987 births
Living people
Footballers from Oxford
English footballers
Association football forwards
North Leigh F.C. players
Swindon Town F.C. players
Swindon Supermarine F.C. players
Brackley Town F.C. players
Witney Town F.C. players
Team Bath F.C. players
Oxford City F.C. players
Weymouth F.C. players
Hanwell Town F.C. players
English Football League players
National League (English football) players